The coat of arms of the German state of Baden-Württemberg features a greater and a lesser version.

History

The coat of arms of Baden-Württemberg was determined after the merging of the former German states Baden, Württemberg-Baden and Württemberg-Hohenzollern, that were divided due to different occupying forces after World War II, in 1952. The creation of the state was not without controversies and thus only the state colours black and gold were determined in 1952, but not yet the arms. The latter were only regulated in the Gesetz über das Wappen des Landes Baden-Württemberg (Law on the Coat of Arms of Baden-Württemberg) of 3 May 1954. Its use is moreover regulated by an order dated 2 August 1954. It was designed by Fritz Reinhardt.

The shield shows three black lions with red tongues on a golden background. The arms refer to the coat of arms of the Duke of Swabia whose House of Hohenstaufen had used these arms. The name of Suabia had long been discussed for use with the newly created state but it failed to be adopted due to resistance from parts of Baden.

Greater coat of arms
The six small coat of arms at the top stand for the origins of parts of Baden-Württemberg. They are from left to right:

 Coat of arms of Franconia for former Franconian regions in the northeast:
This field represents Tauber Franconia, the region around the river Tauber in the northeastern part of Baden-Württemberg. It was part of the Duchy of Franconia. While the main part of Franconia became part of Bavaria, this area became separated and part of Baden-Württemberg. The coat of arms features a field divided per fess dancetty gules and argent, i.e. it is divided into an upper red band and a lower white band by a three-pointed zig-zag line. This was the coat of arms of the prince-bishops of Würzburg, who were also dukes of Franconia.
 Coat of arms of the House of Hohenzollern for the Province of Hohenzollern:
The second shield shows the coat of arms of the House of Hohenzollern (party per cross argent and sable). It represents a region north of lake Constance around Hohenzollern Castle, the ancestral seat of the House of Hohenzollern. The coat of arms of Hohenzollern is parted per cross; the first and third field are argent (white/silver), the second and fourth shield are sable (black).
 Coat of arms of Baden for Baden:
The third shield shows the coat of arms of Baden, a red diagonal band on a golden shield (or, a bend gules). This represents the former Margraviate and Grand Duchy of Baden, the western and south-western part of Baden-Württemberg. As one of the two biggest predecessors of Baden-Württemberg, also part of the state's name, this shield is about 10 percent bigger than the others.
 Coat of arms of Württemberg for Württemberg:
The fourth shield shows the coat of arms of Württemberg. On a golden shield, there are three superposed deer antlers. This shield represents the Region of Württemberg, the other main part of the state, which lies in the central and eastern part. For the same reasons, it is the same size as the coat of arms of Baden.
 Coat of arms of the Electorate of the Palatinate for the region around Mannheim and Heidelberg:
The fifth shield shows the coat of arms of the Elector Palatine. This field represents those parts of former Electorate of the Palatinate, on the right side of river Rhine. The black field is charged with a yellow lion rampant with red claws, tongue and crown (sable, a lion rampant or armed langued and crowned gules).
 Coat of arms of Austria for Further Austria in the south:
The sixth shield shows the coat of arms of Further Austria: a white horizontal band on a red field (gules, a fess argent). This shield represents the former possessions of the house of Habsburg, the family of the former Austrian Emperors.

Thereby the arms of Baden and Württemberg are slightly elevated. The supporters are a stag to the left representing Württemberg and a griffin to the right representing Baden. The supporters are those used in the arms of the pre-war states of Baden and Württemberg. They are positioned on a pedestal of black and gold which is not further mentioned in the law about the arms.

The great coat of arms is only used by higher authorities, i.e. the state premier, the government, the ministries, the state's representation to the Federation and to the EU, the Supreme State Court and higher courts, the audit court and the Administrative Districts.

Lesser arms
The lesser coat of arms features the shield topped with crown styled like leaves that symbolises the people's sovereignty after the abolishment of monarchy in Germany. The lesser arms are used by all state authorities that do not employ the great coat of arms, as well as by those notaries that are civil servants.

References

 Landesverfassung, Namen und Wappen des neuen Bundeslandes Landeszentrale für politische Bildung 
Baden-württembergische Befindlichkeiten. Das Land und seine Symbolik. ed. Petra Schön, Hauptstaatsarchiv Stuttgart, 2002. 
 Akten zur Entstehung des Landeswappens(Item EA 99/002 at Baden-Württemberg State Archives; digital images of the original draft can be found here.

See also

Origin of the coats of arms of German federal states.

Culture of Baden-Württemberg
Baden-Wurttemberg
Baden-Wurttemberg
Baden-Wurttemberg
Baden-Wurttemberg